Rochelle Riviera is an unincorporated community in Springdale Township, Washington County, Arkansas, United States. Per the coordinates it is located south of US 412 east of Springdale on the north bank of the White River.

References

Unincorporated communities in Washington County, Arkansas
Unincorporated communities in Arkansas